Četež pri Turjaku is a settlement in the hills west of Turjak in the Municipality of Velike Lašče in Slovenia. The area is part of the traditional region of Lower Carniola and is now included in the Central Slovenia Statistical Region.

Name
The name of the settlement was changed from Četež to Četež pri Turjaku in 1953.

References

External links
Četež pri Turjaku on Geopedia

Populated places in the Municipality of Velike Lašče